Matthias Heidemann (7 February 1912 – 30 November 1970) was a German footballer who played as a striker.

During his club career he played for Werder Bremen and Bonner FV. He earned three caps for the Germany national team between 1933 and 1935, and played in the 1934 FIFA World Cup where Germany finished third.

References

External links
 

1912 births
1970 deaths
German footballers
Footballers from Cologne
Association football forwards
Germany international footballers
1934 FIFA World Cup players
Bonner SC players
SV Werder Bremen players